Phaenopharos struthioneus, the small red winged stick insect, is a medium-sized stick insect found in Malaysia and Sumatra. This species is extinct in Singapore. Both males and females are known for their small red stubby wings, which are used solely for the purpose of displaying when threatened. Thus, they cannot fly.

References

External links
 Phasmid Study Group: PSG 205 Phaenopharos struthioneus

Lonchodidae
Phasmatodea of Asia
Insects of Malaysia
Insects of Indonesia
Insects described in 1859
Taxa named by John O. Westwood